Leptopleuroninae is an extinct subfamily of procolophonid reptiles.

References

Leptopleuronines
Triassic parareptiles
Early Triassic first appearances
Late Triassic extinctions